Őcsény is a village in Tolna county, Hungary.

Population

Number of population

Ethnic composition

Religion

Main sights 

Sárköz Museum
Traditional costume
Airport
Vine-harvest Procession
Reformed Church
Alisca Roman fortress
Roman Catholic Church
Árpád statue
Gemenc forest

Sister Cities 

 /Gombos
 /Gyergyószárhegy

References

Populated places in Tolna County